Luke Robert Walsh (born 12 May 1987) is an Australian former professional rugby league footballer who played for the Newcastle Knights and the Penrith Panthers in the Australian National Rugby League and for St Helens and the Catalans Dragons in the Super League.

Playing career
Walsh came to prominence at Newcastle after the retirement of Andrew Johns and injuries to Jarrod Mullen during the 2007 season. Although hampered by an ankle injury which kept him out of premier league, Walsh was able to make his début at halfback in round 12 against the Sydney Roosters. Walsh underwent surgery on his ankle at the end of the season.

In mid-March 2009, Walsh signed with the Penrith Panthers, which would enable him to play for the Panthers in the 2009 season. Wearing jumper number 14, Walsh scored the opening try against the Gold Coast Titans on his Penrith debut. Walsh was named the Players' Player of the Panthers for 2011.

On 28 May 2013 Walsh agreed a deal with St. Helens. After two seasons at St Helens Walsh joined fellow Super League side Catalans Dragons.  A mainstay of the team in 2017, Walsh was injured in the game against the Hull Kingston Rovers in the third round of the 2018 season and on 24 April 2018 he announced his retirement from playing on medical advice. Walsh currently plays as a halfback for Central Charlestown Butcher Boys in the Newcastle Rugby League first grade competition.

References

10. https://www.facebook.com/newcastlerugbyleague/photos/a.383862408412247/2279822518816217/?type=3
26 May 2021

External links

Catalans Dragons profile
Saints Heritage Society profile
Penrith Panthers profile
SL profile

1987 births
Living people
Australian rugby league players
Catalans Dragons players
Gamilaraay
Indigenous Australian rugby league players
Newcastle Knights players
Penrith Panthers players
Rugby league five-eighths
Rugby league halfbacks
Rugby league players from Newcastle, New South Wales
St Helens R.F.C. players
Western Suburbs Rosellas players
Windsor Wolves players